Peauope Suli Fifita (born 18 October 1963) is a Tongan former sprinter. He competed in the men's 100 metres at the 1988 Summer Olympics.

References

External links
 

1963 births
Living people
Athletes (track and field) at the 1988 Summer Olympics
Tongan male sprinters
Olympic athletes of Tonga
Athletes (track and field) at the 1990 Commonwealth Games
Commonwealth Games competitors for Tonga
Place of birth missing (living people)
20th-century Tongan people